Harit is an Indian given name and surname. Notable people with the name include:

Harit Nagpal (born 1961), Indian businessman 
Amine Harit (born 1997), French footballer
Ram Babu Harit (born 1957), Indian politician

Indian given names
Indian surnames